Cengiz Yacan Yazar

1976-77

Titles
Istanbul League Champion

Roster

1977-78

Titles
Turkish Second Basketball League Champion

Roster

1978-79

Titles
Turkish League Champion

Roster

1979-80

Roster

1980-81

Roster

1981-82

Roster

1982-83

Titles
Turkish League Champion

Roster

1983-84

Titles
Turkish League Champion

Roster

1984-85

Roster

1985-86

Honors
Turkish League Runner-Up

Roster

1986-87

Roster

1987-88

Roster

1988-89

Roster

1989-90

Honors
Korać Cup Quarterfinalist

Roster

1990-91

Roster

1991-92

Titles
Turkish League Champion

Roster

1992-93

Titles
Turkish League Champion

Honors
 European Cup Runner-Up
Roster

1993-94

Titles
Turkish League Champion
Turkish Cup Champion

Honors
 Euroleague Quarter Finalist

Roster

1994-95

Roster

1995-96

Titles
 Korać Cup Champion
Turkish League Champion
Turkish Cup Champion

Roster

1996-97

Titles
Turkish League Champion
Turkish Cup Champion

Honors
 Euroleague Quarter Finalist

Roster

1997-98

Titles
Turkish Cup Champion

Honors
 Euroleague Quarter Finalist
Turkish League Runner-Up

Roster

1998-99

Honors
 Euroleague Quarter Finalist
Turkish League Runner-Up

Roster

1999-00

Honors
 Euroleague Third Place
Turkish League Runner-Up

Roster

2000-01

Titles
Turkish Cup Champion

Honors
 Suproleague Third Place
Turkish League Runner-Up

Roster

2001-02

Titles
Turkish League Champion
Turkish Cup Champion

Roster

2002-03

Titles
Turkish League Champion

Roster

2003-04

Titles
 Turkish League Champion

Honors
Turkish Cup Runner-Up

Roster

2004-05

Titles
Turkish League Champion

Honors
 Euroleague Quarter Finalist

Roster

2005-06

Titles
Turkish Cup Champion

Honors
 Euroleague Quarter Finalist
Turkish League Runner-Up

Roster

2006-07

Titles
Turkish Cup Champion

Honors
Turkish League Runner-Up

Roster

2007-08

Roster

2008-09

Titles
Turkish League Champion
Turkish Cup Champion

Roster

2009-10

Honors
Turkish League Runner-Up

Roster

2010-11

Roster

2011-12

Honors
Turkish League Runner-Up

Roster

2012-13

Roster

2013-14

Honors
Turkish Cup Runner-Up

Roster

2014-15

Titles
Turkish Cup Champion

Honors
 Euroleague Quarter Finalist
Turkish League Runner-Up

Roster

Sources
TBLStat.net Efes Pilsen Team Profile 

Anadolu Efes S.K.
EuroLeague team past rosters